Saint Madron or Maddern was a Pre-Congregational Saint, monk and hermit.

Life
He is honoured in Cornwall at St Maddern's Church in the village of Madron. He also has a Holy well, noted for its healing powers.

Madron was born in Cornwall and was a disciple of Saint Ciarán of Saigir. Very little is known of him except that many miracles were attributed to him. He died c.545 AD near Land's End, Cornwall, and is remembered in Madron Parish Church (Madron Village) and his Feast Day is 17 May.

Identification
John T. Koch  has suggested that the saint was not a historical figure but rather a Christianisation of the Mythical Celtic Modron the mother goddess. Indeed, some aspects of the veneration at Madron's well do appear to derive from Pagan origins.

Others  have suggested that the saint's life is a retelling of the story of St. Madrun, a daughter of Vortimer, a king of Gwent.

Gallery

Notes

References 

 

Medieval Cornish saints